André Versini (1923–1966) was a French film actor and screenwriter.  He also directed a couple of films.

Selected filmography
 Thus Finishes the Night (1949)
 No Pity for Women (1950)
 Mademoiselle Josette, My Woman (1950)
 The Straw Lover (1951)
 Crimson Curtain (1952)
 They Were Five (1952)
 The Secret of Helene Marimon (1954)
 Queen Margot (1954)
 Leguignon the Healer (1954)
 Je suis un sentimental (1955)
 It Happened in Aden (1956)
 The Babes in the Secret Service (1956)
 Anyone Can Kill Me (1957)
 The Cat (1958)
 Nathalie, Secret Agent (1959)
 Venetian Honeymoon (1959)
 Mandrin (1962)
 Mission to Venice (1964)

References

Bibliography
 Capua, Michelangelo. Anatole Litvak: The Life and Films. McFarland, 2015.
 Hayward, Susan. French Costume Drama of the 1950s: Fashioning Politics in Film. Intellect Books, 2010.

External links

1923 births
1966 deaths
French male television actors
French male film actors
French screenwriters
French film directors
People from Saint-Mandé